San Antonio Rose  is a 1941 American black-and-white musical film starring Jane Frazee and featuring Lon Chaney, Jr. and Shemp Howard; it was also designed as a showcase for the then-popular vocal group The Merry Macs. The plot involves two rival groups of entertainers converging on an abandoned roadhouse with the intent to reopen it, unaware that a gangster is eyeing the property for his own scheme.

Plot

Cast
Jane Frazee – Hope Holloway
Robert Paige – Con Conway
Eve Arden – Gabby Trent
Lon Chaney Jr. – Jigsaw Kennedy
Shemp Howard – Benny the Bounce
The Merry Macs – Themselves, The Merry Macs
Mary Lou Cook – Mona Mitchell (as Mary Lou Cook – The Merry Macs)
Joe McMichael – Harry (as Joe McMichael – The Merry Macs)
Ted McMichael – Ted (as Ted McMichael – The Merry Macs)
Judd McMichael – Phil (as Judd McMichael – The Merry Macs)
Richard Lane – Charles J. Willoughby
Elaine Condos – Elaine (Dancer)
Louis Da Pron – Alex (Dancer)
Charles Lang – Ralph
 Riley Hill – Jimmy (as Roy Harris)
Peter Sullivan – Don
Richard Davies – Eddie
Luis Alberni – Nick Ferris

Soundtrack
"Mexican Jumping Bean"
Music by Gene de Paul
Lyrics by Don Raye
Sung by The Merry Macs
"You're Everything Wonderful"
Written by Henry Russell
Sung by Jane Frazee and Eve Arden
"Gee But It's Tough to Be a Glamour Girl"
Written by Henry Russell
Sung by Jane Frazee and Eve Arden
"The Hut-Sut Song (A Swedish Rhapsody)"
(uncredited)
Written by Ted McMichael, Jack Owens and Leo Killion
Sung by The Merry Macs
"You've Got What It Takes"
Music by Gene de Paul
Lyrics by Don Raye
"Bugle Woogie Boy"
Written by Henry Russell
"San Antonio Rose"
Written by Bob Wills
"Hi, Neighbor"
(uncredited)
Written by Jack Owens
Sung by Jane Frazee
"Once Upon a Summertime"
(uncredited)
Lyrics by Jack Brooks
Music by Norman Berens
"The Old Oaken Bucket"
(uncredited)
Lyrics by Samuel Woodworth
Music by George Kiallmark

External links
 
 San Antonio Rose at Answers.com
 San Antonio Rose album at Answers.com
 Watch San Antonio Rose (1941) Free Online
 
 
 Poster; Movie, Daybill, 1941, Australia, San Antonio Rose, 30 inch.
 
 

1941 films
American black-and-white films
1941 musical films
Films directed by Charles Lamont
American musical films
Universal Pictures films
1940s English-language films
1940s American films